The Nova Southeastern University College of Medical Sciences is part of the Health Professions Division of Nova Southeastern University.  It offers a two-year program of study leading to a master's degree in biomedical sciences.  The Master of Biomedical Sciences degree program is accredited by the Southern Association of Colleges and Schools (SACS).

References

External links
College web-site

Nova Southeastern University